The City of Sydney Open was a golf tournament played at Moore Park Golf Club in Sydney, New South Wales, Australia between 1963 and 1970. The inaugural event was part of the celebrations of the 175th anniversary of the founding of Sydney. The 1969 event was played over 54 holes.

Winners

References 

Golf tournaments in Australia
Golf in New South Wales
Sport in Sydney